Graham Stokes (22 March 1858 – 19 December 1921) was an English cricketer who played first-class cricket for Kent County Cricket Club in the early 1880s.

Stokes was born at Greenwich in Kent, the son of Henry Graham Stokes, Proctor to the Admiralty and solicitor, and his wife Elizabeth Sewell. He made his first-class debut for Kent against Surrey in 1880. He made three further first-class appearances in 1851, against Derbyshire, Lancashire, and Surrey. Stokes scored 39 runs in his four matches, with a top score of 27.

Outside of cricket he worked as a solicitor. He died at Blackheath, in London on 19 December 1921. His brothers Frederick and Lennard both played international rugby union for England, as well as also playing first-class cricket for Kent.

References

External links

1858 births
1921 deaths
People from Greenwich
English cricketers
Kent cricketers
English solicitors